Jelawat is a suburb in Bachok district, Kelantan, Malaysia.

Jelawat may also refer to:

Typhoon Jelawat, list of typhoons by this name
Jelawat (state constituency), state constituency in Malaysia